Ethan Walker Ross (born 6 March 1997) is an English professional footballer who plays as a goalkeeper for York City, on loan from  club Stockport County.

He progressed at the youth system at Arsenal and Cambridge United before joining West Bromwich Albion. From here, he had two loan stints with National League North side Worcester City and then Southern League side Redditch United. He then joined Colchester United in 2018 and joined Maidstone United on loan in January 2019. He made his professional debut for Colchester in April 2019. He left Colchester to join Lincoln City in July 2020.

Career
Born in Enfield, London, Ross came through the youth ranks at Arsenal and Cambridge United before joining West Bromwich Albion. He had two loan periods at Worcester City, with his first stint with the National League North side in 2015–16 producing nine league and two cup appearances, and his second stint in 2016–17 appearing 26 times in the league, with one cup appearance. He spent the 2017–18 season with Redditch United. He made 20 appearances in the Southern League Premier Division and played five cup games between September and December.

Ross was released by West Brom at the end of the 2017–18 season and agreed to join League Two club Colchester United on a two-year contract on 7 June 2018. He joined National League side Maidstone United in an initial one-month loan deal on 4 January 2019. He made his debut on 5 January in Maidstone's 2–1 victory at Hartlepool United.

Ross made his professional debut on 22 April 2019 as a substitute during Colchester's League Two 1–1 draw with Yeovil Town after Dillon Barnes had been sent off for violent conduct. He kept a clean sheet during his 40-minutes on the pitch. He made his full debut the following week, keeping a clean sheet in Colchester's 2–0 win against Milton Keynes Dons.

On 24 July 2020, Ross signed for League One club Lincoln City on a one-year deal. He would be loaned to Weymouth on 5 January 2021 until the end of the season. On the 4 June 2021, it was announced that he would be leaving at the expiration of his Lincoln City contract.

On 8 July 2021, Ross signed a three-year deal at National League side Stockport County. On 19 March 2022, Ross joined fellow National League side, Aldershot Town on loan for the remainder of the campaign.

On 1 July 2022, Ross joined York City on loan for the 2022-23 season. He made his debut and kept his first clean sheet for the Minstermen in a 2-0 win over Woking

Career statistics

References

External links

1997 births
Living people
Footballers from Greater London
English footballers
Association football goalkeepers
West Bromwich Albion F.C. players
Worcester City F.C. players
Redditch United F.C. players
Colchester United F.C. players
Lincoln City F.C. players
Weymouth F.C. players
Stockport County F.C. players
Maidstone United F.C. players
Aldershot Town F.C. players
York City F.C. players
National League (English football) players
Southern Football League players
English Football League players